Mel Kiper Jr. (born July 25, 1960) is an analyst covering American football for ESPN. He has appeared on ESPN's annual NFL draft coverage since 1984, providing in-depth information on the nation's potential draft picks.

Career
Kiper said that Ernie Accorsi, general manager of the Baltimore Colts, encouraged him to become a draft analyst. Accorsi told him that there was a market for draft information and suggested that Kiper convert his analysis into a business.

Kiper and fellow draft analyst Todd McShay are often featured together and compare their mock drafts on ESPN programs.

Big Board
Kiper creates what he calls his "big board", on which he ranks the top 25 players every week. During ESPN draft coverage, Kiper's big board appears on the ticker and updates automatically once a player is selected.

Video game appearances
Kiper voices himself as the ESPN draft expert, and has his own mock draft in ESPN NFL 2K5 and is "unlockable" as a free agent longsnapper.
Kiper appears in NFL Head Coach as a draft expert.
Kiper appears in Madden NFL 07 and 08 during the pre-draft workout period.

Personal
Kiper's wife Kim, whom he married in 1989, assists him in running Mel Kiper Enterprises from their Baltimore home. They have one daughter together.

References

External links

 Mel Kiper Jr.'s website

1960 births
Living people
Calvert Hall College High School alumni
ESPN people
People from Baltimore
People from Harford County, Maryland